Yeniköy is a village in the Çamardı district of Niğde Province, Turkey. As of 2021 it has a total population of 490.

References 

Çamardı towns and villages